Sir Tommy, also called Old Patience, is a patience or solitaire card game using a single pack of 52 playing cards. It is said to be the ancestor of all patiences, hence its alternative title.  It is a half-open, planner type of patience game in the same family of card-building games as Calculation and Strategy. It is also known as Try Again and Numerica.

Rules

Cards are dealt one at a time. When an ace turns up, it forms a foundation which builds up to King regardless of suit. Four such foundations should be built. A card that cannot yet be placed on the foundation is placed onto one of four wastepiles; once placed, it cannot be moved, but the top card of each wastepile remains available to be placed on a foundation.

The game is won if all cards are emptied from the wastepiles and built on the foundations.

Strategy 
To achieve a win, skilled players typically reserve one wastepile for Kings and for other high cards, and trying to avoid trapping a lower-ranked card under all four cards of some higher rank.  With good play, it's possible to win 1 in 5 games.

Variants 
Many variants exist, including one where four cards are turned up at a time rather than one, and must all be placed before making other moves. Puss in the Corner has a slightly different layout, and is a very similar game except that building happens by colour rather than suit.

Closely related to Sir Tommy are Auld Lang Syne and Tam O'Shanter, both of which are considered nearly impossible to win; Old Fashioned and Acquaintance are both slightly easier versions of Auld Lang Syne.

In the less flexible Alternate, the foundations are built in alternate colors, building one upwards, and the other downwards. Building happens by colour in the variant Colours, with six waste-piles making the game easier.

Strategy is a Sir Tommy variant invented by Albert H. Morehead and Geoffrey Mott-Smith, and uses eight tableau piles to make the game much easier.  Last Chance is also easier courtesy of seven tableau piles and a reserve pile.

The popular patience game Calculation is also derivative from Sir Tommy, and changes the goal to place cards on the foundations by increasing ranks of 1, 2, 3 and 4 respectively, and is a game of great skill.

References

Literature

See also
 Calculation 
 Puss in the Corner
 Colours
 List of solitaires
 Glossary of solitaire

Single-deck patience card games
Planners (games)